Conner McGlinchey (born 22 May 1993) is a Scottish professional footballer who plays for Beith Juniors in the . He has previously played in the Scottish Premier League for Hamilton Academical.

Career
McGlinchey made his senior debut for Hamilton Academical on 14 May 2011, in a 1–2 loss against Inverness Caledonian Thistle.

In February 2012, he signed a one-year contract extension with Hamilton. Later that month, he joined Berwick Rangers on loan.

McGlinchey was released by Hamilton, by mutual consent, on 31 January 2013.

On 8 February 2013, McGlinchey signed for Peterhead until the end of the season. In July 2013, he agreed a deal to keep him at Peterhead for the 2013–14 season.

McGlinchey signed for Junior side Arthurlie in July 2014, and moved on to Beith Juniors two years later

Career statistics

References

1993 births
Living people
Scottish footballers
Hamilton Academical F.C. players
Berwick Rangers F.C. players
Peterhead F.C. players
Arthurlie F.C. players
Beith Juniors F.C. players
Scottish Premier League players
Scottish Football League players
Scottish Professional Football League players
Scottish Junior Football Association players
Association football defenders
West of Scotland Football League players